Bolivia  was a state-funded newspaper published in La Paz, Bolivia. The newspaper began publication on 18 November 2019.

It replaced the state-owned newspaper Cambio. Its logo shows the flag of Bolivia, the wiphala and the patuju. It ceased publications on 30 April 2021. 

On the next day, 1 May 2021, its successor Ahora El Pueblo was published for the first time.

References

2019 establishments in Bolivia
Mass media in La Paz
Newspapers published in Bolivia
Publications established in 2019
Spanish-language newspapers
2021 disestablishments in Bolivia
Publications disestablished in 2021